Neftegorsk, formerly Vostok (lit. east) before 1970, is a ghost town in Sakhalin Oblast, Russia.

Building 
The city was built in 1963. It was an urban-type oil-mining settlement, with its name meaning "Oil Town". Construction Minister Yefim Basin decided not to rebuild it after its destruction.

Destruction 
It was devastated on May 28, 1995 by an earthquake, which measured 7.1 on the Richter scale, killing 2,040 people out of a total population of 3,197. An oil-producing town in northern Sakhalin, all buildings in Neftegorsk suffered extensive damage and many were completely destroyed, as they had been built with low quality concrete and were not designed to withstand seismic activity. The majority of the victims were killed by the rubble of their apartment buildings collapsing. Neftegorsk was almost totally flattened, and it was decided not to be rebuilt, instead a memorial was constructed in the area. Many survivors were relocated to other towns in Sakhalin such as Okha, Yuzhno-Sakhalinsk, and Nogliki, while others left Sakhalin for the mainland.

Population

References

External links 
 http://www.vmeste.org/tema/main_0090.shtml
Archive footage of RIA Novosti

Geography of Sakhalin Oblast
Populated places disestablished in 1995
Defunct towns in Russia
Former populated places in Russia
Cities destroyed by earthquakes